Ernst Wulf (3 October 1921 – 2 October 1979) was an East German farmer and political activist who served as chairman of the Peasants Mutual Aid Association, a mass organization within the National Front, from 1964 to 1979.

During the reign of the Third Reich, Wulf was a member of the Reich Labour Service, and fought in the Wehrmacht in World War II, before being captured. After the war, he worked in Hanover for two years before moving to his home town, in the newly created German Democratic Republic. He joined the SED and became noted in the country for his contributions to agricultural output. He was a candidate for the Central Committee of the party in 1958.

In 1960, he was elected deputy chairman of the VdgB, and in 1964 he became chairman, a post he would hold until his death in 1979.

Awards and honours
 Master Builder (1952)
 Patriotic Order of Merit in Bronze (1959)
 Order of Karl Marx (1969)

References

1921 births
1979 deaths
People from Vorpommern-Rügen
People from the Free State of Mecklenburg-Schwerin
Members of the Central Committee of the Socialist Unity Party of Germany
Peasants Mutual Aid Association members
German Army personnel of World War II
German prisoners of war in World War II held by the United States
Recipients of the Patriotic Order of Merit in bronze
Reich Labour Service members